Thomas Cobb may refer to:
Thomas R. Cobb (1828–1892), U.S. Representative from Indiana
Thomas Reade Rootes Cobb (1823–1862), American lawyer, author, politician, and Confederate general
Thomas W. Cobb (1784–1830), United States Representative and Senator from Georgia
Thomas Cobb (author), American novelist and author of Crazy Heart
Tom Cobb, three-act farce by W. S. Gilbert
Sir Thomas Cobb, 1st Baronet of the Cobb baronets
Thomas Cobb (director), American director, editor, compositor, and cinematographer

See also
Cobb (surname)